Phlebolobium maclovianum, known as Falkland rock-cress, is a species of flowering plant in the family Brassicaceae. It is endemic to the Falkland Islands, and is the only species in the genus Phlebolobium.

References

Brassicaceae
Monotypic Brassicaceae genera
Flora of the Falkland Islands
Endangered plants
Taxonomy articles created by Polbot